Rose Mary Matriculation Higher Secondary School is a school in Tirunelveli, South India. It was founded in the early 1980s by  P Jayaraj, who is also the correspondent of the schools.

Location 
The school is located at Palaymkottai. The school has four branches in Tirunelveli:
 Rose Mary Main School, Convent Road, Palayamkottai
 Rose Mary Model School, Convent Road, Palayamkottai
 Rose Mary School, Ram Nagar (Near Thyagarajanagar), Tirunelveli, 
 Rose Mary School, KTC Nagar, Tirunelveli

School uniform 
Shirts and Trousers/Pants for boys: White Shirts and Maroon Trousers/Pants for boys, White Trousers/Pants on Mondays.
Salwar and coat for girls: White Salwar, Maroon Pants and Maroon white blocked coat, White Salwar, White Pants and same coat on Mondays.
Shoes and Socks: Black Socks and Shoes. 
Uniform for teachers on important days: Green Saree with the design of leaves.

References

External links 
 

Primary schools in Tamil Nadu
High schools and secondary schools in Tamil Nadu
Education in Tirunelveli